The 2016–17 Cyprus Volleyball Division 1 was the 40th season of the Cyprus Volleyball Division 1, the highest tier professional volley league in Cyprus. Omonia were the defending champions.

Regular season
The Regular season of the 2016–17 Cyprus Volleyball Division 1 is held in a round robin format. At season finish, teams occupying positions 1-6 advance to 2016-17 Volleyleague Play-offs.

League table

Source: CVF

Play-off (1-4)
The four teams that finished in the places 1 to 4 in the Regular season, compete in the Play-off (1-4). Pafiakos started the playoffs with handicap, 1-0, Omonia and Nea Salamina at 1-1.

Play-out (5-8)
The four teams that finished in the places 5 to 8 in the Regular season, compete in the Play-out (5-8). Anorthosis and Anagennisi started the playoffs with a handicap, 1-0.

Final standings

External links
Cyprus Volleyball Federation

2016 in volleyball
2017 in men's volleyball
Volleyball in Cyprus
Cyprus